The Church of St Lucy is a small Roman Catholic church situated in Valletta, Malta. The church was built in 1570 and features a titular painting above the high altar and the corpse of St Lucian, the martyr.

History
The church of St Lucy was built in 1570, four years after the construction of the city of Valletta began. It was originally dedicated to St Francis of Paola, a statue of whom is on the corner of St Lucy's street just opposite the church. The first Dominicans who went to Valletta from Birgu first administered the sacraments from this church before their church was constructed. The church was rebuilt with money paid by the wine merchants of Valletta. After the church was rebuilt, it was dedicated to Saint Lucy and Saint Vincent Ferrer.

The church building is listed on the National Inventory of the Cultural Property of the Maltese Islands.

Works of art
The titular painting on top of the high altar depicts the Immaculate Conception with Saint Paul, Saint Lucy, Saint Vincent Ferrer and Saint Clare. Beneath the high altar one can find the corpse of St Lucian the Martyr brought from the cemetery of Priscilla in Rome. The side altar are dedicated to St Francis of Paola and St Paschal Baylon.

Feast day
The feast of Saint Lucy is celebrated every year from 1 December and ends on the liturgical feast of the saint on 13 December.

See also

Culture of Malta
History of Malta
List of churches in Malta
Religion in Malta

References

1570 establishments in Malta
Roman Catholic churches in Malta
Buildings and structures in Valletta
National Inventory of the Cultural Property of the Maltese Islands